Himalayacetus is an extinct genus of carnivorous aquatic mammal of the family Ambulocetidae.  The holotype was found in Himachal Pradesh, India, (: paleocoordinates ) in what was the remnants of the ancient Tethys Ocean during the Early Eocene.  This makes Himalayacetus the oldest archaeocete known, extending the fossil record of whales some 3.5 million years.

Himalayacetus lived in the ancient coastline of the ancient Tethys Ocean before the Indian Plate had collided with the Cimmerian coast. Like Gandakasia, Himalayacetus is only known from a single jaw fragment, making comparisons to other ambulocetids difficult.

Description
Upon its discovery, Himalayacetus was described as a pakicetid because the dentary has a small mandibular canal and a dentition similar to Pakicetus.   assigned Himalaycetus to the ambulocetids.

Etymology
Its type is Himalayacetus subathuensis after the Himalayas, cetus, "whale", and the Subathu Formation, the type locality.

Taxonomy
It was considered monophyletic by Uhen (2010). It was assigned to Pakicetidae by Bajpai and Gingerich (1998) and McLeod and Barnes (2008); and to Ambulocetidae by Thewissen et al. (2001) and Uhen (2010).

Notes

References

 
 

Ambulocetidae
Fossil taxa described in 1998
Prehistoric cetacean genera
Extinct animals of India